The 1976 Winter Olympic Games cross-country skiing results. The women's 3 × 5 km relay was replaced by a 4 × 5 km relay at these games.

Medal summary

Medal table

Men's events

Women's events

Participating NOCs
Twenty four nations participated in Cross-country skiing at the 1976 Winter Olympic Games.

Doping controversy
Galina Kulakova of the Soviet Union finished third in the women's 5 km event, but was disqualified due to a positive test for banned substance ephedrine. She claimed that this was a result of using the nasal spray that contained the substance. Both the FIS and the IOC allowed her to compete in the 10 km and the 4 × 5 km relay. This was the first stripped medal at the Winter Olympics.

See also
Cross-country skiing at the 1976 Winter Paralympics

References

External links
Official Olympic Report

 
1976 Winter Olympics
1976 Winter Olympics events
Olympics
Cross-country skiing competitions in Austria